Lepetodrilus is a genus of small, deep-sea sea snails, hydrothermal vent limpets, marine gastropod mollusks in the family Lepetodrilidae.

A few species have been found in methane and sulfide seeps.

Species
Species within the genus Lepetodrilus include:
 Lepetodrilus atlanticus Warén & Bouchet, 2001
 Lepetodrilus concentricus Linse, Roterman & C. Chen, 2019
 Lepetodrilus corrugatus McLean, 1993
 Lepetodrilus cristatus McLean, 1988
 Lepetodrilus elevatus McLean, 1988
 Lepetodrilus fucensis McLean, 1988
 Lepetodrilus galriftensis McLean, 1988
 Lepetodrilus gordensis Johnson, Young, Jones, Waren & Vrijenhoek, 2006
 Lepetodrilus guaymasensis McLean, 1988
 Lepetodrilus japonicus Okutani, Fujikura & Sasaki, 1993
 Lepetodrilus nux Okutani, Fujikura & Sasaki, 1993
 Lepetodrilus ovalis McLean, 1988
 Lepetodrilus pustulosus McLean, 1988
 Lepetodrilus schrolli Beck, 1993
 Lepetodrilus shannonae Warén & Bouchet, 2009
 Lepetodrilus tevnianus McLean, 1991
 Lepetodrilus sp. East Scotia Ridge - from  hydrothermal vents in Scotia Sea

Cladogram 
This cladogram shows the phylogenic relationships within Lepetodrilus, based on sequences of cytochrome-c oxidase I (COI) genes based on Bayesian inference:

References

External links

Lepetodrilidae